Ples sa zvijezdama is the Croatian version of Dancing with the Stars and translates precisely such. Nine seasons have aired on HRT1 from 2006 to 2013 with a ninth season airing on Nova TV in 2019. Currently, there is no announcement regarding a second season on Nova. If so, it would be the tenth season overall in the whole series.

Professionals timeline 
Color key:

Key:

 Won the season
 Placed second in the season
 Placed third in the season
 Placed last in the season

Season 1
The first season of Ples sa zvijezdama (Dancing with the Stars) started airing on 2 December 2006.

The contestants were:
 Zrinka Cvitešić (actress) with Nicolas Quesnoit (Winners)
 Rene Bitorajac (actor) with Mirjana Žutić (runner-up)
 Maja Šuput (singer) with Ištvan Varga (6th eliminated)
 Žarko Radić (actor) with Ivana Antinac (5th eliminated)
 Zoran Vakula (TV meteorologist) with Ksenija Pluščec (4th eliminated)
 Sandra Bagarić (opera singer) with Leon Ajtlbez (3rd eliminated)
 Dubravko Šimenc (water polo player) with Tamara Despot (2nd eliminated)
 Zdenka Kovačićek (singer) with Hrvoje Kraševac (1st eliminated)

Highest score of the season (40):
Zrinka & Nicolas (Jive – 3rd episode)
Zrinka & Nicolas (Slowfox – 4th episode)
Maja & Ištvan (Paso Doble – 4th episode)
Maja & Ištvan (English Waltz – 6th episode)
Zrinka & Nicolas – total – 80 points (English Waltz & Paso Doble – 7th episode)
Maja & Ištvan (Slowfox – 7th episode)
Zrinka & Nicolas – total – 120 points (English Waltz, Samba & Freestyle – final episode)
Rene & Mirjana (Freestyle – final episode)

Lowest score of the season:
Žarko & Ivana – 16 points (Samba – 5th episode)

Season 2
The second season of Ples sa zvijezdama ("Dancing with the Stars") started airing on 3 November 2007.

The contestants were:
 Luka Nižetić (singer) with Mirjana Žutić (Winners)
 Lana Jurčević (singer) with Hrvoje Kraševac (runner-up)
 Davor Gobac (singer) with Tamara Despot (6th eliminated)
 Nikolina Pišek (TV hostess) with Ištvan Varga (5th eliminated)
 Danijela Martinović (singer) with Nicolas Quesnoit (4th eliminated)
 Iva Majoli (tennis player) with Marko Herceg (3rd eliminated)
 Damir Markovina (actor) with Ana Herceg (2nd eliminated)
 Mirko Fodor (TV host) with Žana Alerić (1st eliminated)

Highest score of the season (40):
Luka & Mirjana (Paso Doble – 6th episode)
Lana & Hrvoje - total – 80 points (Quickstep & Paso Doble – 7th episode)
Luka & Mirjana - total – 80 points (Tango & Cha-cha-cha – 7th episode)
Luka & Mirjana (Paso Doble  & Freestyle – final episode)

Lowest score of the season:
Davor & Tamara – 20 points (Samba – 5th episode)

Season 3
The third season of Ples sa zvijezdama ("Dancing with the Stars") started airing on 25 October 2008.

The contestants were:
 Mario Valentić (actor, model and former Mister Croatia) with Ana Herceg (Winners)
 Zlata Mück (TV and radio hostess) with Ištvan Varga
 Daniela Trbović (TV hostess) with Nicolas Quesnoit
 Martina Zubčić (bronze olympic medal in taekwondo) with Robert Schubert
 Antonija Šola (singer) with Hrvoje Kraševac
 Goran Grgić (actor) with Sara Stojanović
 Luka Vidović (magician and actor) with Mirjana Žutić
 Nikša Kaleb (handball player) with Tamara Despot

Highest score of the season:
 Zlata & Ištvan- 40 points (Tango – final episode)
 Mario & Ana – 40 points (Freestyle – final episode)

Lowest score of the season:
Goran & Sara – 17 points (Jive – 3rd episode)

Scorecard

Bold numbers indicate the couples with the highest score for each week.
Italic numbers indicate the couples with the lowest score for each week.
 indicates the couples eliminated that week.
 indicates the returning couple that finished in the bottom two.
Dances are:
Cha-cha-cha
Waltz
Rumba
Quickstep
Jive
Tango
Paso doble
Slowfox
Samba
Freestyle

Season 4
The fourth season of Ples sa zvijezdama ("Dancing with the Stars") started airing on 31 October 2009 on HRT1.

The contestants were:
 Franka Batelić (singer) with Ištvan Varga (Winners)
 Gordan Kožulj (swimmer) with Ana Herceg
 Ana Ugarković (TV chef) with Nicolas Quesnoit
 Vedran Mlikota (actor) with Marija Šantek
 Iva Šulentić (TV & radio hostess) with Damir Horvatinčić
 Frano Lasić (singer & actor) with Mirjana Žutić
 Vanessa Radman (actress) with Robert Schubert
 Sandi Cenov (singer) with Gabriela Pilić
Highest score of the season:
 Iva & Damir – 40 points (Jive – 3rd episode)
 Franka & Ištvan – 40 points (Quickstep – 6th episode)
 Franka & Ištvan – 40 points (Slowfox – 7th and final episode)
 Franka & Ištvan – 40 points (Freestyle – final episode)
 Gordan & Ana – 40 points (Freestyle – final episode)
Lowest score of the season:
Ana & Nicolas – 20 points (Cha-cha-cha – 1st episode)

Scorecard

Bold numbers indicate the couples with the highest score for each week.
Italic numbers indicate the couples with the lowest score for each week.
 indicates the couples eliminated that week.
 indicates the returning couple that finished in the bottom two.
Dances are:
Cha-cha-cha
Waltz
Rumba
Quickstep
Jive
Tango
Paso doble
Slowfox
Samba
Freestyle

Season 5
The fifth season of Ples sa zvijezdama ("Dancing with the Stars") started airing on 30 October 2010 on HRT1.

The contestants were:
 Nera Stipičević (singer and actress) with Damir Horvatinčić (Winners)
 Mila Horvat (TV hostess) with Robert Schubert
 Bojan Jambrošić (singer) with Martina Bastić
 Sanja Doležal (singer) with Hrvoje Kraševac
 Petar Vlahov (TV host) with Ana Domišljanović
 Zijad Gračić (actor) with Tihana Devčić
 Ivana Brkljačić (athlete) with Marko Herceg
 Hrvoje Rupčić (musician) with Marija Stošić
Highest score of the season:
 Nera & Damir – 40 points (Paso doble – 3rd episode; Tango and slowfox- 6th episode; quickstep and Cha-cha-cha - 7th episode; Tango, Paso doble & freestyle - finale)
 Mila & Robert - 40 points (freestyle - finale)
Lowest score of the season:
 Petar & Ana – 18 points (Cha-cha-cha – 1st episode, Jive – 3rd episode)

Scorecard

Bold numbers indicate the couples with the highest score for each week.
Italic numbers indicate the couples with the lowest score for each week.
 indicates the couples eliminated that week.
 indicates the returning couple that finished in the bottom two.
Dances are:
Cha-cha-cha
Waltz
Rumba
Quickstep
Jive
Tango
Paso doble
Slowfox
Samba
Viennese Waltz
Freestyle

Season 6
The sixth season of Ples sa zvijezdama ("Dancing with the Stars") started airing on 29 October 2011 on HRT1.

The contestants were:
 Jelena Perčin (actress) with Hrvoje Kraševac
 Denis Ahmetašević (musician) with Mirjana Žutić
 Martina Tomčić (opera singer) with Marko Herceg
 Lana Banely (TV sport journalist) with Damir Horvatinčić
 Hrvoje Šalković (writer) with Lejla Bjedov
 Marko Tolja (singer) with Ana Herceg
 Miro Ungar (singer and actor) with Marija Stošić
 Tatjana Jurić (TV and radio hostess) with Robert Schubert
Highest score of the season:
 Marko & Ana – 37 points (Tango – 3rd episode)
Lowest score of the season:
 Hrvoje & Lejla – 15 points (Quickstep – 2nd episode)

Scorecard

Bold numbers indicate the couples with the highest score for each week.
Italic numbers indicate the couples with the lowest score for each week.
 indicates the couples eliminated that week.
 indicates the returning couple that finished in the bottom two.
Dances are:
Cha-cha-cha
Waltz
Rumba
Quickstep
Jive
Tango
Paso doble
Slowfox
Samba
Viennese Waltz
Freestyle

Season 7

The seventh season of Ples sa zvijezdama ("Dancing with the Stars") aired in late 2012 on HRT1.

The contestants were:
 Barbara Radulović with Robert Schubert (Winners)
 Mirna Medaković with Damir Horvatinčić
 Saša Lozar with Marija Šantek
 Ana Begić with Hrvoje Kraševac
 Darko Janeš with Marija Stošić
 Blaženka Leib with Patrik Majcen
 Niko Pulić with Tamara Despot
 Davor Radolfi with Ana Herceg
 Frano Domitrović with Ana Domišljanović
 Nika Fleiss with Marko Herceg

Season 8

The eight season of Ples sa zvijezdama ("Dancing with the Stars") aired in late 2013 on HRT1.

The contestants were:
 Mislav Čavajda with Petra Jeričević (Winners)
 Ornela Vištica with Marko Herceg
 Sanda Dubravčić with Nicolas Quesnoit
 Giuliano with Marija Marinčić
 Iva Mihalić with Robert Schubert
 Žanamari Lalić with Damir Horvatinčić
 Ronald Braus with Ana Domišljanović
 Janko Popović Volarić with Valentina Walme
 Nevena Rendeli with Patrik Majcen
 Damir Hoyka with Tihana Matijaščić

Season 9

The ninth season of Ples sa zvijezdama will premiere in March 2019.

Scoring charts

 Red numbers  indicate the couples with the lowest score for each week
 Green numbers  indicate the couples with the highest score for each week
 indicates the couple that was eliminated that week
 indicates the returning couple that finished in the bottom two
 indicates the couple returned to the competition
 indicates the winning couple
 indicates the runner-up couple
 indicates the third place couple

Season 10

The tenth season of Ples sa zvijezdama premiered in March 2022.

Scoring charts

 Red numbers  indicate the couples with the lowest score for each week
 Green numbers  indicate the couples with the highest score for each week
 indicates the couple that was eliminated that week
 indicates the returning couple that finished in the bottom two
 indicates the returning couple that finished in the bottom three but was saved by the judges
 as part of the winning couple of the week, the couple received two additional points for the following week.
 indicates the winning couple
 indicates the runner-up couple
 indicates the third place couple
 indicates the fourth place couple

Season 11

The eleventh season of Ples sa zvijezdama premiered in March 2023.

Scoring charts

 Red numbers  indicate the couples with the lowest score for each week
 Green numbers  indicate the couples with the highest score for each week
 indicates the couple that was eliminated that week
 indicates the returning couple that finished in the bottom two
 indicates the returning couple that finished in the bottom three but was saved by the judges
 indicates the winning couple
 indicates the runner-up couple
 indicates the third place couple
 indicates the fourth place couple

External links
Official Site

Croatian television series
2006 Croatian television series debuts
Croatia
Croatian reality television series
Dance competition television shows
Non-British television series based on British television series
Croatian Radiotelevision original programming